Ayre United A.F.C. are a football club based in the village of Kirk Andreas, Andreas parish, Ayre in the Isle of Man. They compete in the Isle of Man Football League Canada Life Premier League. They wear tangerine and black strips and play home games at the Andreas Playing Fields in Andreas village.

They are Coached by the world famous Nicholas Hurt (hurty). As well as Skill'ddddddd for the Combination Team.

The Ayre United Captain is Jamie Callister.

History
The club was formed on 10 April 1967, and applied to play in the Isle of Man Football League Division Two for the  1967–68 season. They finished their first season on just four points. However, within two season they had their first trophy
when they won the Woods Cup and the Fred Faragher Cup. The club have been Division Two champions four times. They were first promoted in 1976–77. After being promoted in 1986–87 they stayed in Division One and achieved the club's highest league placing in 1988–89 when they were Division One runners-up. In the 1995–96 season they finished as runners-up to the Police in Division Two and won both the Woods Cup and the Paul Henry Gold Cup. The club's highest achievement came in the 2002–03 season when they won the Manx FA Cup at The Bowl stadium in Douglas, beating St Georges 2–1. In the 2004–05 season they finished third in Division One.

As 2019 draws to an end, the last decade for Ayre United, to say the least can be classed as turbulent. The club started the decade in strong form winning the Woods Cup in 12/13 season, however that turned out to be the high point of the clubs recent history. As the midpoint of the decade arrived the Ayre United was arguably at the lowest point in the club's lucrative 50+ year history. As the legendary FA cup winning players came to the end of their careers, Ayre struggled fielding teams often having to forfeit game after game. The true extent of the struggle to field a team became apparent when even cult hero, Liam "Lugsy" Lord racked up some appearances. Despite this in the past two years, "the Tangerines" have begun their ascend from darkness. A combination of players returning to the club, upcoming exciting youth players, and top of the range management has given the club a new feeling of hope. The inside view is that the next decade will see a new group of players put their names into the history books. They currently aspire to compete in the Premier League next season.

2020–21  Season 
As a result of COVID-19 pandemic, the 2019–20 season was unfortunately voided, meaning all the Tangerines hard work to get into a very promising position was about to go unrewarded. However, justice was done when Pulrose pulled out of the first division for 202-–21 season, meaning the FA were forced to promote the best team from Division 2. Ayre United were promoted.

Facilities
The first clubhouse was an old RAF hut transported from Jurby airfield and opened in 1968. This was replaced and a new clubhouse opened at Easter, 1999. Ayre United were the first club on the Isle of Man to have floodlights, which were installed in 1972. A new club bar was opened on 28 May 2006. The club hope to build new changing facilities. The clubhouse is nicknamed the "Fortress". Folk law states, whenever the club attacks the infamous "sh*thouse end" in the second half in need of a result, something magical happens.

Teams
As well as the first team Ayre United also have reserves team that plays in the Isle of Man Football Combination captained by the mighty Harry Read as well a women's team captained by James Bucuris and various age range teams from Under-7s to Under-17s. Despite an average age of 24, they have some freakishly good future prospects. To name some names the infamous Burger (Ryan Teare) aged 18, renowned for his vicious left peg. Alongside him another exciting young player Chesney (a prolific youth attacker), also known as Deacon Lombard-Chibnall. Another young prospect coming through the ranks is Matthew Boyde, known for not knowing which foot he is and wearing his imfamous balenciaga football boots whilst toking.

Honours

League
Division Two champions (4): 1976–77, 1982–83, 1986–87, 2001–02
Division Two runners-up (1): 1995–96
Division One runners-up (1): 1989

Cup
Manx FA Cup (1): 2002–03
Woods Cup (8): 1969–70, 1970–71, 1976–77, 1983–84, 1987–88, 1995–96, 2001–02, 2012–13
Paul Henry Gold Cup (1): 1995–96
Fred Faragher Cup (3): 1969–70, 1978–79, 1979–80

References

External links
Official website

Football clubs in the Isle of Man
1967 establishments in the Isle of Man
Association football clubs established in 1967